Zar und Zimmermann (Tsar and Carpenter) is a comic opera in three acts, music by Albert Lortzing, libretto by the composer after Georg Christian Römer's Der Bürgermeister von Saardam, oder Die zwei Peter, itself based on the French play Le Bourgmestre de Saardam, ou Les deux Pierre by Mélésville, Jean-Toussaint Merle, and Eugène Centiran de Boirie. Ultimately, it goes back to the historical Grand Embassy of Peter the Great. Gaetano Donizetti had set the same story in his 1827 opera Il borgomastro di Saardam.

Performance history
The opera was first performed at the Stadttheater in Leipzig, on 22 December 1837. Lortzing's most successful and enduring work, it is still regularly performed in German-speaking countries.

Roles

Synopsis

The action takes place in Saardam, Holland, in 1698.

Peter the Great of Russia, disguised as Peter Michaelov, a common laborer, is working in a shipyard in the Dutch town of Saardam, to learn shipbuilding techniques for his navy. He befriends a fellow Russian also working in the yard, Peter Ivanov, a deserter from the Russian army. Peter Ivanov is in love with Marie, the niece of Van Bett, the Burgomaster of Saardam. Tsar Peter is told of trouble in Russia, and decides to return home.

Van Bett has been told to find a foreigner named Peter in the shipyard. The English ambassador, Syndham, and the French ambassador, Chateauneuf, have both heard the rumor of Tsar Peter's disguised presence and are looking for him, which convinces Van Bett that "Peter" is an important man. But in confusion, he identifies the wrong Peter. Chateauneuf recognises the real Tsar, and concludes an alliance with him. Syndham is fooled and presents Peter Ivanov with a passport.

Van Bett, very confused, salutes Peter Ivanov with an elaborate ceremony. Peter Ivanov gives the passport to Tsar Peter, who uses it to leave quietly, having first blessed Peter Ivanov's marriage to Marie, and appointed him to a high office in Russia.

Recordings and adaptations
Georg Hann, Hubert Buchta, Wilhelm Strienz, Margot Gripekoven, Bruno Muller, Heinrich Holzlin, Emma Mayer, Hermann Schmid-Berikoven. Chor und Orchester des Reichssenders Stuttgart / Bernhard Zimmerman. 28 May 1936.(The Radio Years) (details from the recording)
Hermann Prey, Peter Schreier, Gottlob Frick, Erika Köth; Chor des Leipziger Rundfunks, Staatskapelle Dresden, conductor Robert Heger. 1966 EMI.
Raymond Wolansky, Peter Haage, Hans Sotin, Lucia Popp, Herbert Fliether, Noël Mangin, Horst Wilhelm, Ursula Boese, Franz Grundheber; Ballet and Chorus of the Hamburg State Opera, Philharmonisches Staatsorchester Hamburg, conductor Sir Charles Mackerras. 1969 Arthaus Musik.
In 1956 it was adapted into a film in East Germany, The Czar and the Carpenter.

References

Anderson, James, The Complete Dictionary of Opera and Operetta, Wings Books, 1993. 
Brown, Clive (1992), "Zar und Zimmermann" in The New Grove Dictionary of Opera, ed. Stanley Sadie (London)

External links

Libretto in German at Opera Guide

German-language operas
Operas by Albert Lortzing
1837 operas
Operas
Operas set in the Netherlands
Works about the Dutch Golden Age
Operas set in the 17th century
Cultural depictions of Peter the Great